The 1972 Oklahoma State Cowboys football team represented Oklahoma State University in the Big Eight Conference during the 1972 NCAA University Division football season. In their first and only season under head coach Dave Smith, the Cowboys compiled a 6–5 record (4–3 against conference opponents), tied for third place in the conference, and outscored opponents by a combined total of 259 to 203.

The team's statistical leaders included George Palmer with 937 rushing yards, Brent Blackman with 572 passing yards, Steve Pettes with 154 receiving yards, and Alton Gerard with 42 points scored.

The team played its home games at Lewis Field in Stillwater, Oklahoma.

Schedule

Roster

References

Oklahoma State
Oklahoma State Cowboys football seasons
Oklahoma State Cowboys football